Wallis Sands State Beach is a public recreation area located on the Atlantic Ocean in the town of Rye, New Hampshire. The state park offers a sandy beach with bathhouse, picnicking, and 500-car pay-parking lot.

History
 Coastal station
During the 19th century and early 20th century, Wallis Sands was a Life-Saving Station of the United States Life-Saving Service and subsequently was a station of the United States Coast Guard. The station was discontinued around 1938.
 State park
The first parcel of the future state park, about one acre in size, was purchased by the state in 1901. That fragment was used as a wayside park in the 1950s.
 Jellyfish incident
In July 2010, nearly 150 beachgoers and swimmers were stung here on the same day by a lion's mane jellyfish. Most were treated on site with vinegar, and several children were taken to a hospital. A lifeguard had pitchforked a  jellyfish – whose longest tentacle was  – to try to drag it ashore and dispose of it; however, the dead jellyfish broke apart, releasing its nematocysts on the beach and stinging the crowd in the span of about 20 minutes.

References

External links

Wallis Sands State Beach New Hampshire Department of Natural and Cultural Resources

State parks of New Hampshire
Parks in Rockingham County, New Hampshire
Rye, New Hampshire
Beaches of New Hampshire